A.H. Parker High School is a four-year public high school in Birmingham, Alabama. It is one of seven high schools in the Birmingham City School System and is named for longtime Birmingham educator Arthur Harold Parker. School colors are purple and white, and the mascot is the Bison (the 'Thundering Herd'). Parker competes in AHSAA Class 6A athletics.

History 
Originally known as Negro High School, Parker opened as a high school for African-American children in the fall of 1900 with a freshman class of 19 students and one teacher. The school's first graduation was June 3, 1904 at the 16th Street Baptist Church, where 15 students received diplomas. Its founding was spearheaded by pastor and banker William R. Pettiford, and Arthur H. Parker was its first principal.

In September 1910 the school moved to a temporary location - the Lane Auditorium - and began offering skills for women such as sewing, knitting, and child care. By that time the enrollment was about 100 students. Construction of a permanent facility began in 1923, and by 1929 the school had an industrial building, a library and a gymnasium.

In 1937 the school had an enrollment of over 2,700, and in 1939, A.H. Parker retired as principal and the school was subsequently renamed in his honor.

The school continued to grow steadily to 3,761 students in 1946. Because of that large number, the school soon became known as the largest high school for Negroes in the world. In 1953, the school was accredited by the Southern Association of Colleges and Schools, an accreditation it has kept ever since.

In February 2007 the Birmingham City Board of Education announced that Parker would be one of the schools rebuilt using the city's $331 million share of the $1.1 billion Jefferson County School Construction Fund. Plans to demolish the sole remaining historic building on campus, a two-story classroom wing built in 1927 and ultimately torn down in 2011, drew opposition.

Campus 
Parker's current campus opened in 2011. It is a 194,250 square foot facility that was constructed at a final cost of $41 million. The new building was built on a site adjacent to the existing facility, which was then demolished in order to make room for parking and athletic facilities. The school has a media center, a distance-learning lab, a career tech wing and an auditorium that can hold 750 students. The cafeteria seats more than 350.

Student profile 
Enrollment in grades 9-12 for the 2013–14 school year is 884 students. Approximately 98% of students are African-American, 1% are Hispanic, and 1% are multiracial. Roughly 90% of students qualify for free or reduced price lunch.

Parker has a graduation rate of 49%. Approximately 62% of its students meet or exceed proficiency standards in mathematics, and 52% meet or exceed standards in reading. The average ACT score for Parker students is 19.

Notable alumni 
 Oscar Adams Jr., Alabama Supreme Court justice
Rufus Billups, Major General
Eric Bledsoe, NBA basketball player for the New Orleans Pelicans
 Bill Bruton, MLB player
 Buck Buchanan, Pro Football Hall of Fame defensive tackle
 Nell Carter, singer and actress
 Clyde Foster, NASA EEO director
 Erskine Hawkins, musician
 Lola Hendricks, civil rights activist
 Haywood Henry, jazz saxophonist
Larry Langford, former mayor of Birmingham
 Raymond Lee Lathan, member of the Wisconsin State Assembly
 Carlos May,  MLB player 
 Lee May, MLB player
 Willie E. May, Undersecretary of Commerce for Standards and Technology and Director of the National Institute of Standards and Technology from 2015 to 2017
 Avery Parrish, jazz musician
George Perdue,  Alabama legislator
Sun Ra, jazz musician
 John Rhoden, sculptor
Bennie Seltzer, basketball coach
Walter Sharpe, basketball player
Lynneice Washington, lawyer and district attorney
 Chris Woods, football player

References

External links 
Parker website

Educational institutions established in 1900
African-American history in Birmingham, Alabama
Public high schools in Alabama
Schools in Jefferson County, Alabama
1900 establishments in Alabama